Marquess of Carisbrooke was a title in the Peerage of the United Kingdom. It was created in 1917 for Prince Alexander of Battenberg, eldest son of Princess Beatrice of the United Kingdom (youngest daughter of Queen Victoria) and Prince Henry of Battenberg. He was made Viscount Launceston, in the County of Cornwall, and Earl of Berkhamsted at the same time, also in the Peerage of the United Kingdom. Along with other German-surnamed relations of the British Royal family, Alexander also changed his surname at this time, to Mountbatten. The titles became extinct upon Lord Carisbrooke's death in 1960, as he had no sons.

Carisbrooke Castle was the residence of Prince Henry and Princess Beatrice as Governor of the Isle of Wight. The title of Marquess of Berkhampstead had previously been conferred with the Dukedom of Cumberland on Prince William Augustus, son of King George II, in 1726. The title of Viscount Launceston had previously been conferred with the Dukedom of Edinburgh on Prince Frederick Louis, later Prince of Wales, also in 1726.

Marquess of Carisbrooke (1917)
Alexander Albert Mountbatten, 1st Marquess of Carisbrooke (1886–1960)

References

Attribution

Extinct marquessates in the Peerage of the United Kingdom
Mountbatten family
1917 establishments in the United Kingdom
Noble titles created in 1917